Club Deportes Ovalle is a Chilean football club who currently play in the fourth level of Chilean football, the Segunda División Profesional de Chile.  The club's stadium is the Estadio Municipal de Ovalle.

Their main rivals are Deportes La Serena and Coquimbo Unido.

Honours

Domestic Honours
Copa Chile
Finalists (1): 2008–09
Tercera Division
Winners (1): 1993

Players

Current Roster 2015–16

External links
 Official Site (in Spanish)

Ovalle
Association football clubs established in 1963
1963 establishments in Chile